This List of American films of 1915 is a compilation of American films released in the year 1915.

A–Z

Serials

Short films

See also 
 1915 in the United States

References

External links 

 1915 films at the Internet Movie Database

1915
Films
Lists of 1915 films by country or language
1910s in American cinema